Wat Putthabucha School is a public school located in  Bangkok, Thailand. The school admits secondary students, grades 7 to 12, aged 11–18. The previous name of this school is 'Putthabucha Wittayakom'.

Curriculum
The major programmes at Upper Secondary level include:

 Science-Mathematics (including Physics, Chemistry and Biology) - Mathematics (3 Classes)
 English-Mathematics (2 Classes)
 English-Chinese (1 Classes)
 Social Sciences-Thai (1 Classes)

References

External links
 Official site (in Thai)

Schools in Bangkok
Educational institutions established in 1973
Thung Khru district